State Bank of Southern Utah is a community bank that services Southern Utah. Its corporate headquarters are located in Cedar City. It was established in 1957 and has 16 branches. The president is Eric Schmutz.

As of April 2021, the bank holds approximately $1.7 Billion in deposits. Their focus is in lending to the small businesses and individuals in their communities. The vast majority of its mortgages are sold on to the Federal Housing Administration or Fannie Mae.

References 

Banks based in Utah
Banks established in 1957
1957 establishments in Utah